Kent A. Kramer (born November 21, 1961) is an American politician in the state of Iowa.

Kramer was born in Newton, Iowa. He attended the University of Iowa and is a financial planner. A Republican, he served in the Iowa House of Representatives from 2003 to 2005 (69th district).

References

1961 births
Living people
People from Newton, Iowa
University of Iowa alumni
Businesspeople from Iowa
Republican Party members of the Iowa House of Representatives